Nikon Coolpix 2500 is a digital camera released by Nikon in February 2011. Its image sensor is a CCD with 12 million effective pixels and has 4 colors available: pink, red, silver and black.

Scene Modes 
The S2500 has 6 scene modes which can be selected on the back of the camera:
 Portrait: Useful for taking someone's face.
 Landscape: Useful for taking
 Night Portrait: Useful for taking portraits when the background is dark.
 Night Landscape: Similar to landscape, but more suitable when the background is dark.
 Close-up: Useful for taking detailed pictures.
 Backlighting: ?

See also 
 Nikon Coolpix series

References 
 Nikon Coolpix S2500-Review

External links 
 http://imaging.nikon.com/lineup/coolpix/style/s2500/

S2500
Cameras introduced in 2011